Christopher Lee Thompson (born November 30, 1978) is an American former competition swimmer who won the bronze medal at the 2000 Summer Olympics in the men's 1,500-meter freestyle.  He was the second American swimmer to break the 15-minute mark in the 1,500-meter freestyle, and held the American record for four years.

He attended the University of Michigan, where he was a member of the Michigan Wolverines swimming and diving team from 1997 to 2001.  Both at Michigan and as a post-graduate, Chris swam under coach Jon Urbanchek from 1997 to 2004.  He held the NCAA and American records in the 1,650-yard freestyle for eleven years.

Currently, he coaches the Plymouth Canton Cruisers swim team in Plymouth, Michigan.

See also
 List of Olympic medalists in swimming (men)
 List of University of Michigan alumni

References

External links
 Thompson's bio from USA Swimming.
 20 Questions with Chris Thompson, from USA Swimming.
 Chris Thompson, Brooke Bennett Crowned King and Queen of Tiburon Mile. ''Swimming World Magazine (October 27, 2002).  Retrieved June 16, 2009.

1978 births
Living people
American male freestyle swimmers
Medalists at the FINA World Swimming Championships (25 m)
Michigan Wolverines men's swimmers
Olympic bronze medalists for the United States in swimming
Pan American Games bronze medalists for the United States
Sportspeople from Roseburg, Oregon
Swimmers at the 2000 Summer Olympics
Swimmers at the 2003 Pan American Games
Medalists at the 2000 Summer Olympics
Pan American Games medalists in swimming
Medalists at the 2003 Pan American Games